Hematosalpinx (sometimes also hemosalpinx) is a medical condition involving bleeding into the fallopian tubes.

Symptoms
A hematosalpinx from a tubal pregnancy may be associated with pelvic pain and uterine bleeding. A gynecologic ultrasound will show the hematosalpinx. A hematosalpinx from other conditions may be painless but could lead to uterine bleeding.

Causes
A number of causes may account for a hematosalpinx, by far the most common being a tubal pregnancy. Blood may also escape into the peritoneal cavity leading to a hemoperitoneum.
A hematosalpinx can also be associated with endometriosis or tubal carcinoma. Further, if menstrual blood flow is obstructed (cryptomenorrhea), caused for instance by a transverse vaginal septum, and gets backed up it may lead to a hematosalpinx.

Diagnosis

Diagnosis may include, but is not limited to, ultrasound, magnetic resonance imaging (MRI) and laparoscopy.

Treatment
Treatment is directed at the underlying condition and is usually surgical.

See also
Hydrosalpinx

References

External links 

Noninflammatory disorders of female genital tract